Richard Wentworth may refer to:
Richard Wentworth (bass-baritone) (1911–1991), American opera singer and musical theatre actor
Richard Wentworth (artist) (born 1947), British artist, curator and teacher
Richard Alan Wentworth, mathematician at the University of Maryland
Richard Wentworth, pulp magazine character as The Spider

See also
Richard de Wentworth (died 1339), Bishop of London